Saint-André is a civil parish in Madawaska County, New Brunswick, Canada.

For governance purposes it is entirely within the town of Grand Falls, which is a member of the Northwest rural district.

Before the 2023 governance reform, a small area along the Saint John River was part of the town of Grand Falls, with the remainder forming the incorporated rural community of Saint-André, itself formed in 2006 by the merger of the village of St. André and the local service district of the parish of Saint-André.

Origin of name
The parish takes its name from the Roman Catholic ecclesiastical parish.

History
Saint-André was erected from Saint-Léonard Parish in 1907.

Boundaries
Saint-André Parish is bounded:

on the east, beginning at a point on the Victoria County line about 35.4 kilometres south of the Restigouche County line, then running generally southerly along the Victoria County line to the Saint John River, about 75 metres west of the mouth of Little River;
on the south by the Saint John River, running upriver along first the Victoria County line and then the international border;
on the northwest, beginning in the Saint John on the prolongation of Bourgoin Road, then running along the prolongation and Bourgoin Road to the rear line of grants along the Saint John, which coincides with Route 2 in this area, then southeasterly along Route 2 about 650 metres to the rear line of the tier of grants along Bourgoin Road in Saint-Léonard Parish, then generally northeasterly along the rear line of the Bourgoin Road grants to the end of the tier and then along its prolongation to Route 255, then northeasterly and northwesterly along the rear line and northeastern line of the southeastern tier of the Coombes Road Settlement in Saint-Léonard Parish, then northeasterly and northwesterly along the southeastern and northeastern lines of the northwestern tier of Coombes Road Settlement to its northernmost corner, about 1 kilometre northeast of the bend of Route 17, then northeasterly along the prolongation of the northwestern line of the northwestern tier to the starting point.

Communities
Communities at least partly within the parish;

Comeau Ridge
Levesque Settlement
Martin Siding
McManus Siding
Poitras Siding

Powers Creek
Saint-Amand
Saint-André
Woodville

Bodies of water
Bodies of water at least partly in the parish:
Little River
Saint John River
Powers Creek
Castonguay Lake

Demographics
Parish population total does not include Grand Falls or the former incorporated village of St. André

Population
Population trend

Language
Mother tongue (2016)

See also
List of parishes in New Brunswick

Notes

References

Parishes of Madawaska County, New Brunswick